Donald George Vogan (August 23, 1929 – August 15, 2009) was a Canadian ice hockey player with the Lethbridge Maple Leafs. He won a gold medal at the 1951 World Ice Hockey Championships in Paris, France. The 1951 Lethbridge Maple Leafs team was inducted to the Alberta Sports Hall of Fame in 1974. He also played with the Moose Jaw Canucks.

References

1929 births
2009 deaths
Canadian ice hockey defencemen
Moose Jaw Canucks players
Sportspeople from Regina, Saskatchewan
Ice hockey people from Saskatchewan